Damian Krajanowski (born April 12, 1983 in Ruda Śląska) is a Polish footballer who currently plays for GKS Tychy.

Career

Club
In July 2011, he moved to Arka Gdynia on a two-year contract.

References

External links
 

1983 births
Living people
Polish footballers
Flota Świnoujście players
Ruch Chorzów players
Arka Gdynia players
GKS Tychy players
Sportspeople from Ruda Śląska
Association football defenders